Igors Troickis (Igor Anatolyevich Troitskiy; born 11 January 1969) is a former football defender from Latvia. He obtained a total number of 41 caps for the Latvia national team between 1992 and 2001. His last club was FK Rīga. Troickis also played as a professional in Russia during his career.

Honours
 Baltic Cup (1):
 1993
 Latvian Champion (4):
1993, 1994, 1995, 1996

References

 
 

1969 births
Living people
Association football defenders
Soviet footballers
FK Jelgava players
Latvian footballers
Latvia international footballers
Skonto FC players
FC Baltika Kaliningrad players
Latvian expatriate footballers
Expatriate footballers in Russia
Latvian expatriate sportspeople in Russia
Russian Premier League players
FK Ventspils players
FK Rīga players
FC Kristall Smolensk players
FC Lokomotiv Saint Petersburg players